Roque Avallay (born 14 December 1945 in San Rafael, Mendoza) is a former Argentine football striker. He played for a number of clubs in Argentina and represented the Argentina national football team.

Avallay started his career with Deportivo Maipú in 1964, it was not long before he was signed by Independiente of the Primera División Argentina. In his first year with the club they won the Copa Libertadores 1965.

In 1966 Avallay moved to Rosario to play for Newell's Old Boys, it was in 1968 that he received his first call-up to play for the Argentina national team.

In 1970 Avallay joined Huracán of Buenos Aires. He was part of the team that won the Metropolitano 1973 championship.

In later years Avallay played for Atlanta,  Chacarita Juniors and Racing Club before returning to Huracán in 1979.

Avallay retired from playing at the end of 1980 with a total of 184 goals in 522 games in the Argentine Primera, leaving him in 14th place on the all-time list of top scorers. He has since gone into coaching and youth development work and has worked with the Huracán youth team.

Titles

References

1945 births
Living people
Sportspeople from Mendoza Province
Argentine footballers
Argentina international footballers
Association football forwards
Club Atlético Independiente footballers
Newell's Old Boys footballers
Club Atlético Huracán footballers
Club Atlético Atlanta footballers
Chacarita Juniors footballers
Racing Club de Avellaneda footballers
Argentine Primera División players